Farancia erytrogramma (also known commonly as the rainbow snake, and less frequently as the eel moccasin) is a species of large, nonvenomous, highly aquatic, colubrid snake, which is endemic to coastal plains of the southeastern United States. Two subspecies are recognized as being valid, one of which has been declared extinct.

Etymology
The specific name, erytrogramma, is derived from the Greek words ερυθρóς (erythros), meaning "red," and γράμμα (gramma), meaning "letter/word" but in this case probably the author means γραμμή (grammi) meaning "line/stripe".

Common names
Other common names for F. erytrogramma include horn snake, red-lined snake, red-lined horned snake, red-sided snake, sand hog, sand snake, and striped wampum.

Description
Dorsally, rainbow snakes have smooth, glossy bluish-black back scales, with three red stripes. They have short tails, with a spiny tip which they sometimes use as a probe. Adults may show yellow coloration along the sides and on the head.

They usually grow to a total length (including tail) of 36-48 inches (91–122 cm), although some specimens have been recorded up to 66 inches (168 cm) in total length. Females are larger than males.

Behavior
Rainbow snakes are rarely seen due to their secretive habits. They spend most of their lives in the water, hiding in aquatic vegetation or other forms of cover. They are strong swimmers, and also know how to burrow into mud and sand. Rainbow snakes are not aggressive when captured, and do not bite their captors.

In New Kent County, Virginia, they are abundant in sandy fields near the Chickahominy River, and great numbers are turned up by plows in the spring.

Diet
Rainbow snakes subsist mainly on eels, but also prey on small frogs, tadpoles, and salamanders. They eat their prey alive, usually swallowing them head first.

Reproduction
Adult female rainbow snakes usually lay their eggs in July, leaving them underground in sandy soil. A clutch consists of around 20 eggs on average, but large females may lay over 50.  The young are hatched in late summer or fall.

Habitat
Rainbow snakes are found in aquatic habitats ranging from cypress swamps and marshes to blackwater creeks, slow-moving streams, and sandy coastal plain.

Geographic range
F. erytrogramma is found from southern Maryland to southeastern Louisiana, including eastern Virginia, southeastern North Carolina, South Carolina, Georgia, northern Florida, Alabama, and Mississippi. A small population once inhabited the Lake Okeechobee region in southern Florida, but was declared extinct on October 5, 2011. One was seen at the Ocala National Forest, in Marion County, in early 2020 and the sighting was confirmed by the National Museum of Florida as the first in 50 years at this location.

Subspecies
There are two recognized subspecies of F. erytrogramma:

Farancia erytrogramma erytrogramma (Palisot de Beauvois, 1802) – common rainbow snake
Farancia erytrogramma seminola (Neill, 1964) – southern Florida rainbow snake (declared extinct on October 5, 2011))

References

Further reading
Baird SF, Girard C (1853). Catalogue of North American Reptiles in the Museum of the Smithsonian Institution. Part I.—Serpents. Washington, District of Columbia: Smithsonian Institution. xvi + 172 pp. (Abastor erythrogrammus, pp. 125–126).
Behler JL, King FW (1979). The Audubon Society Field Guide to North American Reptiles and Amphibians. New York: Alfred A. Knopf. 743 pp. . (Farancia erytrogramma, pp. 610–611 + Plate 546).
Boulenger GA (1894). Catalogue of the Snakes in the British Museum (Natural History). Volume II., Containing the Conclusion of the Colubridæ Aglyphæ. London: Trustees of the British Museum (Natural History). (Taylor and Francis, printers). xi + 382 pp. + Plates I-XX. (Abastor erythrogrammus, p. 290).
Conant R, Bridges W (1939). What Snake is That? A Field Guide to the Snakes of the United States East of the Rocky Mountains. (With 108 drawings by Edmond Malnate). New York and London: D. Appleton-Century. Frontispiece map + 163 pp. + Plates A-C, 1-32. (Abastor erythrogrammus, pp. 42–43 + Plate 2, Figure 6).
Gray JE (1849). Catalogue of the Specimens of Snakes in the Collection of the British Museum. London: Trustees of the British Museum. (Edward Newman, printer). xv + 125 pp. (Abastor erythrogrammus, p. 78).
Jan G, Sordelli F (1868). Iconographie générale des Ophidiens, Vingt-neuvième livraison. Paris: Baillière. Index + Plates I-VI. (Calopisma erythrogrammum, Plate IV, Figure 2; Plate V, Figure 1). (in French).
Morris PA (1948). Boy's Book of Snakes: How to Recognize and Understand Them. A volume of the Humanizing Science Series, edited by Jacques Cattell. New York: Ronald Press. viii + 185 pp. (Abastor erythrogrammus, pp. 88–89, 179).
Neill WT (1964). "Taxonomy, natural history, and zoogeography of the rainbow snake, Farancia erytrogramma (Palisot de Beauvois)". American Midland Naturalist 71: 257–295.
Palisot de Beauvois [AMFJ] (1802). In: Sonnini CS, Latreille PA (1802). Histoire Naturelle des Reptiles, avec figures dessinées d'après nature. Tome IV. Seconde Partie. Serpens. Paris: Deterville. (Crapelet, printer). 410 pp. (Coluber erytrogrammus, new species, pp. 141-142). (in French).
Powell R, Conant R, Collins JT (2016). Peterson Field Guide to Reptiles and Amphibians of Eastern and Central North America, Fourth Edition. Boston and New York: Houghton Mifflin Harcourt. xiv + 494 pp. . (Farancia erytrogramma, p. 406 + Plate 39).
Richmond ND (1954). "Variation and Sexual Dimorphism in Hatchlings of the Rainbow Snake, Abastor erythrogrammus ". Copeia 1954 (2): 87–92.
Schmidt KP, Davis DD (1941). Field Book of Snakes of the United States and Canada. New York: G.P. Putnam's Sons. 365 pp. Abastor erythrogrammus, pp. 104–105, Figure 21 + Frontispiece (colored plate).
Smith HM, Brodie ED Jr (1982). Reptiles of North America: A Guide to Field Identification. New York: Golden Press. 240 pp. . (Farancia erytrogramma, pp. 162–163).
Steen, David A.; Stevenson, Dirk J.; Beane, Jeffery C.; Willson, John D.; Aresco, Matthew J.; Godwin, James C.; Graham, Sean P.; Smith, Lora J.; Howse, Jennifer M.; Rudolph, J. Craig; Pierce, Josh B.; Lee, James R.; Gregory, Beau B.; Jensen, John; Stile, Sierra H. (2013). "Terrestrial movements of the red-bellied mudsnake (Farancia abacura) and rainbow snake (F. erytrogramma)". Herpetological Review 44: 208–213.
Stejneger L, Barbour T (1917). A Check List of North American Amphibians and Reptiles. Cambridge, Massachusetts: Harvard University Press. 125 pp. (Abastor erythrogrammus, p. 75).
Zim HS, Smith HM (1956). Reptiles and Amphibians: A Guide to Familiar American Species: A Golden Nature Guide. Revised edition. New York: Simon and Schuster. 160 pp. (Abastor erythrogrammus, pp. 74, 156).

External links

University of Georgia Savannah River Ecology Laboratory
Virginia Department of Game and Inland Fisheries
Farancia erytrogramma page at Andrew Durso's "Life is short, but snakes are long"

Farancia
Reptiles described in 1802
Fauna of the Southeastern United States
Reptiles of the United States
Taxa named by Palisot de Beauvois